Macrohastina is a genus of moths in the family Geometridae.

Species
Macrohastina azela (Butler, 1878)
Macrohastina gemmifera (Moore, 1868)
Macrohastina stenozona (Prout, 1926)

References

External links
Natural History Museum Lepidoptera genus database

Asthenini